Evan Rankin (born March 28, 1986) is an American former professional ice hockey player. He last played with the Toledo Walleye of the ECHL.

Playing career
Rankin played regularly for the Toledo Walleye of the ECHL between 2009 and 2011. On November 25, 2011, the Notre Dame product was signed by the Rochester Americans of the American Hockey League to a professional tryout contract. After contributing immediately to the offense, Rankin remained with the Americans for the duration of the 2011–12 season, signing his first AHL contract and scoring an impressive 29 points in 35 games.

On July 3, 2012 it was announced that Rankin had been re-signed by the Americans to a one-year AHL contract extension. In the 2012–13 season, Rankin appeared in 48 games for the Amerks producing offensively with 31 points.

Rankin left the Amerks as a free agent and on July 10, 2013, was signed to a one-year contract with the Syracuse Crunch of the AHL.

On July 22, 2014, Rankin signed his first contract abroad, agreeing to a one-year deal with German club, Kölner Haie of the DEL. In the 2014–15 season, Rankin appeared in 18 games in Koln, however struggled to adapt to the European perimeters, totalling just 3 points before opting to return to the AHL for a second stint with the Rochester Americans on January 26, 2015.

Following his fifth year with the Walleye in the 2016-17 season. Rankin as the club's franchise leader in goals announced his retirement from professional hockey on September 1, 2017.

Career statistics

References

External links

1986 births
Living people
Grand Rapids Griffins players
Ice hockey players from Michigan
Kölner Haie players
Lehigh Valley Phantoms players
Lincoln Stars players
Manitoba Moose players
Notre Dame Fighting Irish men's ice hockey players
Rio Grande Valley Killer Bees players
Rochester Americans players
St. John's IceCaps players
Syracuse Crunch players
Toledo Walleye players
Utica Comets players
American men's ice hockey right wingers